Address to Young Men on Greek Literature (alternatively, "Address To Young Men On How They Might Derive Benefit From Greek Literature," ) is a text by Basil of Caesarea. Although Basil is best known for his religious writing by most people, in this exhortation to virtue, Basil encouraged the selective study of Greek texts, and reassured his youthful readers that despite their pagan origin, where poets, historians and philosophers were quite compatible with orthodox Christian thought, they might profitably be studied where they inculcated virtue, as in viewing the reflection of the sun in water before viewing the sun itself.

Editions and commentaries
 Edward R. Maloney, St. Basil the Great to students on Greek literature, with notes and vocabulary, New York: American Book Company, 1901 (online)
 Georg Büttner, Basileios des Grossen Mahnworte an die Jugend uber den nützlichen Gebrauch der heidnischen Literatur, Munich, 1908 (online)
 Roy J. Deferrari, in St. Basil: Letters, vol. 4, Loeb Classical Library, 1934 (online)
 Fernand Boulenger, Saint Basile: Aux jeunes gens sur la manière de tirer profit des lettres helléniques, Collection Budé, Paris, 1935 (repr. 1952, 1965, 2002)
 N.G. Wilson, Saint Basil on the value of Greek literature, London: Duckworth, 1975, 
 Mario Naldini, Basilio di Cesarea: Discorso ai Giovani (Oratio ad adolescentes), Biblioteca Patristica 3, with the Latin version of Leonardo Bruni, Florence: Nardini, 1984

External links

 Greek text and French translation
 Greek text with dictionary lookup links (English) at The Early Church Texts website
 English translations: trans. Padelford (Google Books), trans. Deferrari
 Articles on significance: Frederick Morgan Padelford, Blomfield Jackson

Greek literature (post-classical)
Christianity and Hellenistic philosophy
Books of literary criticism
Essays about literature